Bailey Hunt (born 20 September 1996) is an Australian rules footballer playing for the Western Bulldogs in the AFL Women's competition. Hunt was drafted by the Western Bulldogs with their eighth selection and sixtieth overall in the 2016 AFL Women's draft. She made her debut in the thirty-two point win against  at VU Whitten Oval in the opening round of the 2017 season. She received an AFL Women's Rising Star nomination for her debut match, in which she recorded nine disposals and three tackles. She played every match in her debut season to finish with seven games. It was revealed that Hunt had signed a contract extension with the club on 16 June 2021, after playing 4 games for the club that season.

Statistics
Statistics are correct to the end of the 2021 season.

|- style=background:#EAEAEA
| scope=row | 2017 ||  || 21
| 7 || 0 || 0 || 14 || 23 || 37 || 4 || 16 || 0.0 || 0.0 || 2.0 || 3.3 || 5.3 || 0.6 || 2.3 || 0
|-
| scope=row bgcolor=F0E68C | 2018# ||  || 21
| 6 || 0 || 0 || 19 || 8 || 27 || 6 || 6 || 0.0 || 0.0 || 3.2 || 1.3 || 4.5 || 1.0 || 1.0 || 0
|- style=background:#EAEAEA
| scope=row | 2019 ||  || 21
| 3 || 0 || 0 || 5 || 4 || 9 || 4 || 5 || 0.0 || 0.0 || 1.7 || 1.3 || 3.0 || 1.3 || 1.7 || 0
|-
| scope=row | 2020 ||  || 21
| 6 || 1 || 0 || 45 || 18 || 63 || 16 || 14 || 0.2 || 0.0 || 7.5 || 3.0 || 10.5 || 2.7 || 2.3 || 0
|- style=background:#EAEAEA
| scope=row | 2021 ||  || 21
| 4 || 0 || 0 || 23 || 4 || 27 || 9 || 10 || 0.0 || 0.0 || 5.8 || 1.0 || 6.8 || 2.3 || 2.5 || 0
|- class=sortbottom
! colspan=3 | Career
! 26 !! 1 !! 0 !! 106 !! 57 !! 163 !! 39 !! 51 !! 0.1 !! 0.0 !! 4.1 !! 2.2 !! 6.3 !! 1.5 !! 2.0 !! 0
|}

References

External links 

1996 births
Living people
Western Bulldogs (AFLW) players
Australian rules footballers from Victoria (Australia)
Victorian Women's Football League players
Melbourne University Football Club (VFLW) players